Johannes Thiemann (born February 9, 1994) is a German professional basketball player, who currently plays for Alba Berlin.

Professional career
On 3 June 2016, Thiemann signed a two-year deal with MHP Riesen Ludwigsburg. During the 2020-21 season, he averaged 7.7 points and 3.8 rebounds per game with Alba Berlin. Thiemann re-signed a three-year deal with the team on 21 June 2021.

International career
In 2016, Thiemann was selected for the German national basketball team, to play in the qualification rounds for the EuroBasket 2017. Thiemann played with Germany at the 2020 Summer Olympics in Tokyo. He averaged 6.5 points per game and helped his country reach the quarterfinals.

References

External links
 

1994 births
Living people
Alba Berlin players
Basketball players at the 2020 Summer Olympics
Baunach Young Pikes players
Brose Bamberg players
Centers (basketball)
German men's basketball players
Olympic basketball players of Germany
Riesen Ludwigsburg players
Sportspeople from Trier
Power forwards (basketball)